Sherwin Herman Raiken (October 29, 1928 – January 16, 2009) was a professional basketball player who spent one season in the National Basketball Association (NBA) as a member of the New York Knicks during the 1952–53 season. He attended Villanova University.

External links
 

1928 births
2009 deaths
American men's basketball players
Guards (basketball)
New York Knicks players
Undrafted National Basketball Association players
Villanova Wildcats men's basketball players
Basketball players from Philadelphia